Rosellinula is a genus of fungi in the class Dothideomycetes. The relationship of this taxon to other taxa within the class is unknown (incertae sedis).

The genus was circumscribed by Rolf Santesson in Syst. Ascom. vol.5 (2) on page 311 in 1986.

The genus name of Rosellinula is in honour of Ferdinando Pio Rosellini (1814–1872), who was an Italian mathematician and botanist.

Species
 Rosellinula frustulosae 
 Rosellinula haplospora 
 Rosellinula kalbii 
 Rosellinula lopadii

See also 
 List of Dothideomycetes genera incertae sedis

References

External links 
 Rosellinula at Index Fungorum

Dothideomycetes enigmatic taxa
Dothideomycetes genera
Taxa named by Rolf Santesson